Paul Andrew Waggoner is the lead guitarist of American progressive metal band Between the Buried and Me. A fan of progressive music, he is heavily inspired by John Petrucci, Pat Metheny, Allan Holdsworth and Steve Vai, amongst others. He formerly played guitar in the metalcore bands, From Here On and Prayer for Cleansing. He had also played live guitar as needed for Lamb of God between 2010 and 2014.

Style
Waggoner's playing is heavily influenced by a wide variety of styles—in his work with Between the Buried and Me, he often combines elements of metal, progressive rock, jazz and bluegrass.

Personal life 
Waggoner is vegan and straight edge. Waggoner also owns and operates Nightflyer Roastworks (formerly Parliament Coffee Roasters), as well as Queen City Grounds, a small-batch specialty grade coffee roastery and cafe, respectively, based in Charlotte, NC. He is married with no children. He uses PRS and Ibanez guitars. He has signature guitars with Ibanez, the PWM20, PWM10 and PWM100. He uses D'Addario strings.

References

 

Living people
Lead guitarists
American heavy metal guitarists
Progressive metal guitarists
1979 births
Guitarists from North Carolina
Between the Buried and Me members
21st-century American guitarists